Đinh Thị Thúy (born April 12, 1998) is a member of the Vietnam women's national volleyball team.

Career
Thúy played the 2017 Asian Club Championship with Vietinbank VC and ranked in the seventh place. She was a former captain of Vietinbank VC at 2018 season, as the age of 19.

From 2019 to 2021, Thúy plays for Kinh Bắc Bắc Ninh.

From 2022, Thúy plays for Ninh Bình Doveco.

Clubs 
  Vietinbank VC (2012 – 2019)
  Kinh Bắc Bắc Ninh (2019 – 2021)
  Ninh Bình Doveco (2022 – )

Awards

Individuals 
2016 VTV Binh Dien International Cup - "Best Outside Hitters"

Clubs
 2014 Vietnam League -  Bronze medal, with Vietinbank VC
 2015 Vietnam League -  Runner-Up, with Vietinbank VC
 2016 Vietnam League -  Champion, with Vietinbank VC
 2017 Vietnam League -  Bronze medal, with Vietinbank VC
 2018 Vietnam League -  Bronze medal, with Vietinbank VC
 2020 Vietnam League -  Bronze medal, with Kinh Bắc Bắc Ninh

References

Vietnamese women's volleyball players
1998 births
Living people
People from Hà Nam Province
Vietnam women's international volleyball players
Southeast Asian Games bronze medalists for Vietnam
Southeast Asian Games medalists in volleyball
Competitors at the 2017 Southeast Asian Games
Volleyball players at the 2018 Asian Games
Asian Games competitors for Vietnam
Outside hitters
21st-century Vietnamese women
Competitors at the 2021 Southeast Asian Games
Southeast Asian Games silver medalists for Vietnam